"Nasty Girl" is a song recorded by American group Destiny's Child for their third studio album Survivor (2001). Written by Maurizio Bassi, Naimy Hackett, and its producers Beyoncé Knowles and Anthony Dent, it features a distinct vocal interpolation of Salt-n-Pepa's "Push It" (1987) and Baltimora's "Tarzan Boy" (1985). The song was released as the fourth and final single from Survivor outside North America on March 4, 2002, by Columbia Records.

A moderate commercial success, "Nasty Girl" reached the top ten in Australia and the top 30 in Denmark, the Netherlands, and Switzerland. The accompanying music video for the song was directed by Sanaa Hamri. The song's Maurice's Nu Soul remix served as the second single from the group's remix album This Is the Remix (2002), following the Rockwilder remix of "Bootylicious".

Music video
The music video for "Nasty Girl" starts out with close-ups of the girls chanting the opening lyrics. It transfers to a woman (portrayed by Tiffany Shepis) in a pink fur jacket with thin and tight pants, high heels and strawberry blonde hair carrying bags walking down a neighborhood sidewalk with women turning their heads to look and men pointing at her and talking amongst themselves. She trips and falls when Knowles sings the lyrics "Change don't come your way it will come back to you".
After the chorus, it changes to two women walking out of a corner store and past a man eating a sandwich. Two guys standing there try to push their friend into the girls, but he slows down and starts to talk to one of the girls. The girl starts to wrap her gum around her finger but gets tangled in her hair and a piece of weave comes out.

The screen changes to a woman dancing with a man in a club, but he dislikes the way she is dancing. He tries to calm her down but she accidentally elbows him in the face and upon seeing what she did, she shows apathy and walks away.
It switches to a room full of the previous girls and more in a line waiting to be put in a machine called the "NastyZapper" which transforms them into women with better clothes and hairstyles. Destiny's Child are also in a room with brown and gold tiles and a gold wall in the back. They are also seen sitting on a couch eating popcorn in Dark Blue and gold dresses watching each of the women in the video. The previously transformed women join the girls in the brown and gold room in the end.

The music video was sent to European and Australian music channels in two versions: a video with an edited "album version" and another video with the "Maurice's Nu Soul Remix Edit", which also uses other scenes at some parts. The original video was featured as an enhanced video on the European CD maxi release of the single.

Track listings
All tracks written by Beyoncé Knowles, Anthony Dent, Maurizio Bassi, and Naimy Hackett.

Notes
 signifies additional producer(s)

Charts

Weekly charts

Year-end charts

Certifications

Release history

References

External links
 DestinysChild.com — official site

2002 singles
Destiny's Child songs
Music videos directed by Sanaa Hamri
Song recordings produced by Beyoncé
Songs written by Beyoncé
Songs written by Anthony Dent
Songs written by Maurizio Bassi